C of Tranquility is the tenth studio album by Canibus. It was released on October 5, 2010 on Interdependent Media.

Track listing

Charts

References

External links
 

2010 albums
Canibus albums
Albums produced by Scram Jones
Albums produced by Jake One
Albums produced by Tha Bizness
Albums produced by DJ Premier
Albums produced by J-Zone